Attila Balázs and Fabiano de Paula were the defending champions and chose not to defend their title.

Fabrício Neis and David Vega Hernández won the title after defeating Rameez Junaid and Purav Raja 6–4, 6–4 in the final.

Seeds

Draw

References
 Main Draw

Thindown Challenger Biella - Doubles